The house of Hénin is a family of the Belgian high nobility, one of its branches was titled Prince of Chimay. Alliances were made with important Spanish noble families such as house of Borja and the house of Velasco.

The surname comes from the town of Hénin-Beaumont in Flanders-Artois, currently in Northern France. In the 13th century, the family grew into three different branches, such as the branch of Hénin-Liétard d'Alcase and the branch of the lords of Bossu.

The main family mausoleum ("Chapelle des Seigneurs") is located inside the Church of Boussu and considered one of the major artworks of Jacques du Broeucq.

Members

Counts of Bossu 

Pierre I de Hénin, Lord of Bossu † 1490: knight of the Golden Fleece.;married to Isabeau of Lalaing.
Philippe de Hénin, Lord of Bossu;married to Catherine of Ligne-Barbançon
Jean V de Hénin, 1st Count of Bossu; knight of the Golden Fleece ;married to Anne of Bourgogne
Charles de Hénin, 2nd Count of Bossu: No heirs.
Maximilien de Hénin, 3rd Count of Bossu;married to Marguerite of Croy.
Pierre II de Hénin, 4th Count of Bossu
Jacques de Hénin, Marquess of la Veere;married to Marie of Hanaert, Baronnes of Liedekercke.
Marie de Bossu;married to Otto von Brunswick.
Anne de Bossu;married to Luis de Velasco y Velasco, 2nd Count of Salazar.
Juan de Velasco, 2nd Marquess of Belveder; 
Anna de Velasco;married to Rasse de Gavre, 1st Marquess of Ayseau
Hélène de Bossu; married to Íñigo de Borja
Maximilien II de Hénin, 5th Count of Bossu and Marquess of la Vere;married to Alexandrine of Gavre.
Eugène de Hénin, 6th Count of Bossu and Marquess of la Vere;married to Anna-Isabella of Arenberg, Princess of Chimay.

Princes of Chimay 

Philippe de Hénin, 7th Count of Bossu (1646–1688) 10th Prince of Chimay, count of Beaumont, Marquess of la Veere and Baron of Liedekercke: Knight of the Golden Fleece Married to Anne-Louise Verreycken d'Impden.
 Charles-Louis- Antoine de Henin-Liétard d'Alsace (1675–1740) 11th Prince of Chimay married to Charlotte, the daughter of Louis de Rouvroy, duc de Saint-Simon.
 Thomas Philip Wallrad de Hénin-Liétard d'Alsace (1679–1759) Cardinal, Archbishop of Mechelen
 Alexandre Gabriel Joseph de Hénin-Liétard, Marquess of La Verre (1681–1745) 12th Prince of Chimay
 Thomas Alexandre Marc Henri de Hénin-Liétard, prince of Chimay (1732–1759)
 Jean-François-Joseph de Hénin-Liétard d'Alsace (1733–1797)married to Marie Anne Albertine Françoise van de Werve (1747–1810)
 Pierre-Simon de Hénin-Liétard d'Alsace (1772–1825)married to Charlotte Louise Henriette de Croismare (1786–1841)
 Charles Louis Albert de Hénin-Liétard (1805–1860)married to Louise Françoise Pauline, Baroness Durand de Pisieux (1812–1887)
 Simon-Gérard d'Alsace de Hénin-Liétard d'Alsace (1832–1891)married to Baroness Angélique van Brienen de Grootelindt (1832–1921)
 Thierry-Arno-Baudoin-Philippe de Hénin-Liétard d'Alsace (1853–1934), French senatormarried to Charlotte Gabrielle de Ganay
 Philippe-Charles de Hénin-Liétard  d'Alsace (1855–1914)married to Hélène-Marie-Éléonore van Brienen de Groote Lindt
 Philippe Gabriel Maurice Joseph de Hénin-Liétard, 15th prince of Chimay (1736–1804),married to Laure-Auguste de Fitz-James, Princess de Chimay.
 Charles-Joseph de Hénin-Liétard d'Alsace (1744–1794), executed by guillotinemarried to Adélaïde Félicité Étiennette de Monconseil
 Marguerite-Therese d'Alcase, died 1693;married to don Domingo de Aquaviva de Aragon
 Anne-Ernestine d'Alcase:Married to the Marques of Los Rios.

See also
 Boussu
 Prince de Chimay

Notes

 
Lists of Belgian nobility
Nobility of the Spanish Netherlands